10 Great Songs may refer to:
10 Great Songs, a 2009 compilation album by the musical artist Pat Benatar
10 Great Songs, a 2010 compilation album by the musical artist Jethro Tull
10 Great Songs, a 2011 compilation album by the musical artist Selena

See also
 50 Great Songs